Phytoecia uncinata is a species of beetle in the family Cerambycidae. It was described by W. Redtenbacher in 1842. It has a wide distribution in Europe. It feeds on Cerinthe minor and Cerinthe glabra.

References

Beetles described in 1842
uncinata